Curtis Thompson (born February 8, 1996) is an American athlete who throws the javelin.

Born in Trenton, New Jersey, and raised in Florence Township, New Jersey, Thompson is a 2014 graduate of Florence Township Memorial High School. Thompson won the NCAA title for Mississippi State University in 2016, and he also won the 2018 USATF Championship. He has won three national javelin titles in his career.

At the 2020 United States Olympic Trials (track and field) held in Eugene, Oregon, on June 21, 2021, Thompson captured the javelin title with a top throw of 82.78 meters to beat runner-up Michael Shuey, whose top throw was 79.24. Riley Dolezal finished third with a throw of 77.07. Thompson individually recorded the four best throws of the competition. Representing his country at the 2022 World Athletics Championships in Eugene, Oregon, Thompson qualified for the final.

Personal life
His parents are Scott and Karen Thompson. He has one brother, Christopher, who was a collegiate basketball player. Thompson's athletic genes carry through the family as he has several aunts, uncles, and cousins who played badminton for The Jamaican National Team.

References

External links 
 
 
 
 
 

1996 births
Living people
American male javelin throwers
People from Florence Township, New Jersey
Sportspeople from Burlington County, New Jersey
Sportspeople from Trenton, New Jersey
Mississippi State Bulldogs men's track and field athletes
Pan American Games track and field athletes for the United States
Athletes (track and field) at the 2019 Pan American Games
USA Outdoor Track and Field Championships winners
Track and field athletes from New Jersey
Athletes (track and field) at the 2020 Summer Olympics
Olympic track and field athletes of the United States